Ghazi Hamad (غازي حمد) was chairman of the border crossings authority in the Gaza Strip. He was Deputy Foreign Minister in the Hamas government of 2012.

Biography
Hamad was born 1964 in Yebna.

Education and career
He holds a bachelor's degree in veterinary medicine and speaks both English and Hebrew in addition to his native Arabic. He is editor of the weekly message previously and was previously chief editor of the now-defunct Hamas-owned Al Watan newspaper.

For 25 years he has been a member of Hamas, and he is the former editor-in-chief of the Hamas weekly newspaper Ar-Risala. As of October 2004, Hamad was also the head of the Islamic Salvation Party.

He assumed the role of a spokesman for Hamas, having gained considerable credibility through the popularity of his newspaper, his imprisonment by the Palestinian National Authority under the Fatah administration as well as his five-year detention by the Israelis for activities related to Hamas. Mr. Hamad was editor at the time Al-Risala was shut down and he himself was imprisoned by the Palestinian Authority for publishing articles detrimental to the reputation of the PA, particularly its prison system. In August 2006, he wrote an article for Al Ayyam, a Palestinian daily newspaper, stating that "Gaza is suffering under the yoke of anarchy and the swords of thugs," and "It is strange that, when a big effort is taken to reopen Rafah crossing to ease the suffering of the people, you see others who go to shell rockets towards the crossing. Or when someone talks about cease-fire and its importance, you find those who go and shell more rockets. Of course, I do not deny that the occupation committed massacres that cannot be justified. But I support negotiations over what can be fixed."

In 2006, responding to the 2006 shelling of Beit Hanoun in which fire from Israeli tanks killed at least 18 Palestinians and injured 40, Hamad was quoted as saying "Israel should be wiped from the face of the Earth. It is an animal state that recognizes no human worth. It is a cancer that should be eradicated."

On 31 May 2007, Hamad stated his willingness to accept a Palestinian state within the pre-1967 borders.

On 23 September 2011, after Mahmoud Abbas formally asked the United Nations for Palestinian statehood, Hamad stated that he was not consulted and was ill-prepared for it.

References

Hamas members
Living people
Palestinian journalists
1964 births